Perry County Jane Doe, also nicknamed "Girl with the Turquoise Jewelry" is an unidentified woman whose body was found on June 20, 1979, in Watts Township, Perry County, Pennsylvania, near the Juniata River. The cause of her death is not known, but it was considered to be suspicious by the authorities. Her name is still not known, despite efforts to identify her. She is the only unidentified decedent in the county.

Description
The badly decomposed remains were found by a stonemason alongside a river, near a highway in Perry County, Pennsylvania, near Watts Township. The remains were mostly skeletonized and the estimated time of death was months before, perhaps as early as the Autumn of 1978.

The decedent is believed to have been between 15 and 30 years old when she died, although she may have been as old as 38.
She was white, had straight or possibly curly, shoulder-length blond or light brown hair.

She had received dental care during her life, as a back tooth had been removed four or five years prior to her death. She also had teeth fillings. One tooth, which was a molar, had not yet erupted. Her teeth showed no evidence of crowding. Despite that her teeth appeared to have had some dental work, it is not known if she had ever had braces.

Prior to her death, she had suffered a fractured rib, which had healed. Just before her death, she may have returned to Pennsylvania after having spent several months in the southwestern United States. Recent analysis of the decedent's bones indicated that she had spent a long time living in the Midwest or in Southern Canada, near the Great Lakes, when she was an adolescent.

Belongings

Perry County Jane Doe wore several pieces of jewelry. She was wearing two sterling silver rings with turquoise stones, one of which also contained onyx pieces that are believed to have originated in the Southwest, possibly having been made by Navajo or Zuni Indians inhabiting that area. She also had a chain bracelet on her right arm and a turquoise necklace and earrings. The jewelry led authorities to believe the victim had ties to Arizona, New Mexico or a similar region.

She wore a tan jacket, white boots with silver buckles, green and white socks, and blue slacks. The slacks were described as having been made from knitted wool which contained strands of red thread. She was wearing two tops, which consisted of a white shirt and a blue tank top.

Investigation
The victim had been buried shortly after her discovery, but was exhumed in 2008, following the reopening of her case. Her DNA and dental records were recorded and are on file. Because of the condition of her remains, no fingerprints and no cause of death could be confirmed. An initial examination of her teeth indicated that she had had three teeth extracted, but this was later disproved. Despite the fact that these characteristics have been entered into national databases, there have been no matches with missing persons.

About sixty possible identities for her have been ruled out. Her face was reconstructed twice by professionals. A sketch by Barbara Martin-Bailey was drawn in 2009, and the National Center for Missing and Exploited Children created a three-dimensional rendering by digitally adding layers of muscles and skin to a CT scan of her skull, which was released in 2013. A revised image was later released in 2018.

See also
List of unsolved murders
Spokane Millie Doe
Miss X (decedent)
Ruth Marie Terry

References

External links

1978 murders in the United States
1979 murders in the United States
1978 deaths
1978 in Pennsylvania
1979 deaths
20th-century births
20th-century women
Female murder victims
Murdered American children
Unsolved murders in the United States
People murdered in Pennsylvania
Unidentified American children
Unidentified murder victims in Pennsylvania
Violence against women in the United States
History of women in Pennsylvania